Morin is a French surname.

Morin may also refer to:

Places
 Morin-Heights, Quebec, a town in the Laurentian Mountains region of Quebec, Canada
 Morin Lake, a small lake northwest of Prince Albert, Saskatchewan, Canada
 Morin River, a tributary of the Rivière aux Écorces in Quebec, Canada
 Morinville, a town within Sturgeon County in Alberta, Canada
 Grand Morin, a 118 km long river in France, left tributary of the Marne
 Petit Morin, an 86 km long river in France, left tributary of the Marne
 Quartier-Morin, a municipality in the Cap-Haïtien Arrondissement, in the Nord Department of Haiti
 Val-Morin, Quebec, a municipality in the Laurentides region of Quebec, Canada
 Morin Dawa Daur Autonomous Banner, a banner of Hulunbuir, Inner Mongolia, China

Other uses
 Morin (flavonol), a molecule
 Morin khuur, a Mongolian bowed stringed instrument (within whose name the word morin translates as "horse")
 That Pig Of A Morin in a short story by Guy de Maupassant

See also 
 Morini (disambiguation)
 Morrin (disambiguation)